Go Jung-gi (born September 5, 1980), better known by his stage name Junggigo, is a South Korean singer.

Discography

Studio albums

Tribute albums

Extended plays

Singles as lead artist

Collaborative singles

Soundtrack appearances

Filmography

Music videos

Awards and nominations

References

External links

 Profile on Starship Entertainment

1980 births
Living people
South Korean pop singers
South Korean contemporary R&B singers
Starship Entertainment artists
Starship X artists
Korean Music Award winners
21st-century South Korean male  singers
Melon Music Award winners